Tyler Engel (born February 21, 1992) is an American soccer player who last played for Rowdies 2 in the National Premier Soccer League.

Career

Youth, College and Amateur
Engel spent his youth career with the Chicago Magic Academy and the Chicago Fire Academy before signing a letter of intent to play college soccer at Southern Methodist University.  After redshirting his freshman year in 2010, Engel made a total 38 appearances and tallied 12 goals and 10 assists during his time with the Mustangs.  He also helped lead them to a Conference USA Tournament title in 2011.  

After the 2012 season, Engel transferred to the University of North Carolina.  He made a total of 42 appearances for the Tar Heels and tallied 14 goals and seven assists.  He helped lead the Tar Heels to the 2014 College Cup Quarterfinals where they would fall to #2 seed UCLA on penalties.

Engel also played in the Premier Development League for Chicago Fire U-23.

Professional
On January 20, 2015, Engel was selected in the fourth round (81st overall) of the 2015 MLS SuperDraft by Toronto FC.  However, he was cut from the team during preseason training camp.  On May 29, Engel signed a professional contract with NASL side Carolina RailHawks.  He made his professional debut on August 22 in a 3–1 defeat to the New York Cosmos.

Honors

Southern Methodist University
Conference USA Tournament Champions: 2011

References

External links
North Carolina Tar Heels bio

1992 births
Living people
American soccer players
Association football forwards
Chicago Fire U-23 players
National Premier Soccer League players
North American Soccer League players
North Carolina FC players
North Carolina Tar Heels men's soccer players
People from Orland Park, Illinois
SMU Mustangs men's soccer players
Soccer players from Illinois
Toronto FC draft picks
USL League Two players
Tampa Bay Rowdies 2 players